Between August 25 and 30, 2022, fighters of the Allied Democratic Forces attacked six villages in North Kivu, Democratic Republic of the Congo, killing over fifty-four people.

Prelude 
The ADF is a Ugandan jihadist group formed in the 1990s, but spread to eastern Congo in the 2010s. In 2019, the group pledged allegiance to the Islamic State, and a subsequent uptick in civilian attacks occurred. In the summer of 2022, the ADF ramped up attacks in North Kivu, with attacks in Otomabere and Kandoyi killing dozens. with On August 11-12, the ADF freed 800 inmates at a prison in Butembo, killing two policemen in the process.

Attack 
Villagers from Nord-Kivu claimed that the ADF had crossed over from neighboring Ituri province in search of arable land, and attacked six villages in North Kivu around the night of August 25. On August 27, three civilians were killed by the ADF in a locality of Bashu chiefdom, according to a local chief. At 5 am that same day in Kavasewa, a nearby village, the ADF attacked a military outpost before assaulting the village, burning down dozens of houses and bludgeoning multiple women to death. On August 29, an ADF attack west of Oicha killed two.

Attacks ramped up again on August 30, with the ADF pillaging the villages of Alima and Laliya. Fourteen villagers were killed in these attacks. The Congolese army also claimed to have secured control over the area after the ADF left. On the same day, ADF fighters assaulted the hamlet of Beu-Manyama, killing five villagers. International crisis groups, local hospitals, and local human rights groups assessed that the total death toll was over fifty people killed by the ADF in the six days.

References 
Allied Democratic Forces

Massacres in 2022
Attacks in Africa in 2022
August 2022 events in Africa
Massacres in the Democratic Republic of the Congo